The Women's 200m athletics events for the 2012 Summer Paralympics took place at the London Olympic Stadium from August 31 to September 8. A total of 11 events were contested over this distance for 11 different classifications.

Results

T11

 
 
 
The event consisted of 4 heats, 2 semifinals and a final. Results of final:

T12

 
 
 
The event consisted of 3 heats and a final. Results of final:

T34

 
 
 
The event consisted of 2 heats and a final. Results of final:

T35

 
 
 
The event consisted of a single race. Results:

T36

 

The event consisted of 2 heats and a final. Results of final:

T37

 
 
 
The event consisted of 2 heats and a final. Results of final:

T38

 
 
 
The event consisted of 2 heats and a final. Results of final:

T44

 
 
 
The event consisted of 2 heats and a final. Results of final:

T46

 
 
 
The event consisted of 2 heats and a final. Results of final:

T52

 
 
 
The event consisted of a single race. Results:

T53

 
 
 
The event consisted of a single race. Results:

References

Athletics at the 2012 Summer Paralympics
2012 in women's athletics
Women's sport in London